The Foster School in Pittsburgh, Pennsylvania is a building from 1886. It was listed on the National Register of Historic Places in 1986. The school operated until 1939, when its students were transferred to the new elementary wing of Arsenal Junior High School along with those from the nearby Bayard School and Lawrence School.

References

School buildings on the National Register of Historic Places in Pennsylvania
Victorian architecture in Pennsylvania
School buildings completed in 1886
Schools in Pittsburgh
City of Pittsburgh historic designations
National Register of Historic Places in Pittsburgh
Lawrenceville (Pittsburgh)